Nuestra Belleza Nayarit 2016 was the 23rd edition of Nuestra Belleza Nayarit.  A total of 12 delegates were chosen from around the state to compete for the state title. The finale was on July 15, 2016 in the municipality of Compostela. The winner was Estefania Carrillo from Compostela. She had the privilege to represent Nayarit at the national pageant Nuestra Belleza México 2017. 

One month before the national pageant, Estefanía decided to resign from the state title because of personal reasons. Joselyn Preciado, the first runner-up from Rosamorada took the title and represented Nayarit in the national pageant where she won the award of Nuestra Belleza Digital or fan favorite and was part of the top 15.

Nuestra Belleza Nayarit 2016

Pre-arrival predictions

Contestants

References

2016 beauty pageants
Nuestra Belleza México